Marie-Francine  is a 2017 French comedy film directed by Valérie Lemercier.

Cast
 Valérie Lemercier as Marie-Francine Doublet
 Patrick Timsit as Miguel Maraõ
 Hélène Vincent as Annick Legay
 Philippe Laudenbach as Pierric Legay
 Denis Podalydès as Emmanuel Doublet
 Nadège Beausson-Diagne as Nadège 
 Marie Petiot as Clémence
 Anna Lemarchand as Margot
 Simon Perlmutter as Hélio
 Géraldine Martineau as Anaïs
 Loïc Legendre as Xavier
 Danièle Lebrun as The supermarket woman
 Patrick Préjean as The supermarket man
 Pierre Vernier as The client
 Philippe Vieux as Aymeric
 Clara Simpson as Pamela
 Marie Barraud as Caroline
 Salim Torki as Nordine

References

External links
 

2017 films
French comedy films
2017 comedy films
Gaumont Film Company films
2010s French films
2010s French-language films